National Lampoon's Attack of the 5 Ft. 2 In. Women is a 1994 Showtime television film that parodies two sensational news stories from the 1990s: the Tonya Harding-Nancy Kerrigan incident, and the John and Lorena Bobbitt incident. The film is presented as a double feature, with Julie Brown starring in both segments. The title is a takeoff of Attack of the 50 Foot Woman.

Synopsis
The film is presented as two parts of a double feature, the titles being Tonya: The Battle of Wounded Knee and He Never Gave Me Orgasm: The Lenora Babbitt Story.

Tonya: The Battle of Wounded Knee
Figure skater Tonya Hardly (Brown), desperate to win the gold medal in the Olympics, tries to eliminate competitor Nancy Cardigan (Khrystyne Haje) by hiring someone to injure her; although she only suffers a small bruise. The news story is so tragic and heart-rending that all of Tonya's co-conspirators turn themselves in and finger her. Sailing above the scandal, she goes on to compete at the 1994 Winter Olympics, but is undone by her lack of talent and undersized panties.

He Never Gave Me Orgasm: The Lenora Babbitt Story
Lenora Babbitt (Brown), having been recently pardoned for her crimes, tells Dick Langley (Sam McMurray) about the events that had led up to her arrest: She had cut off the penis of her drunken husband, Juan Wayne Babbitt (Adam Storke), because he could not satisfy her sexually. After it was devoured by a dog, Dr. Kelloc (Stanley DeSantis) was able to transplant one from a deceased biker. However, Lenora learns that the biker's widow (Anne De Salvo) now has "visitation rights" to it; thus, when she and Juan perform a re-enactment of the incident on TV, she actually cuts off his new one. He ends up becoming a transsexual, saying on talk shows that he now understands how hard it is to be a woman.

Animated sequences
The film includes animated sequences in which Tonya and Lenora are watching the picture at a drive-in theater. They arrive together in a car at the beginning, Tonya cheers after the first feature, and the two grinning women drive off at the end.

Notes
 The television film was promoted on the cover of the September/October 1994 issue of National Lampoon magazine.
 In 2008, Julie Brown was given permission by Showtime to issue this movie on DVD (Showtime had previously only issued it on VHS) and currently sells copies on her eBay profile and online store.

References

External links
 
 
 National Lampoon's Attack of the 5' 2" Women at Movies.TVGuide.com

1994 television films
1994 films
1994 comedy films
1990s English-language films
1990s parody films
American films with live action and animation
American comedy television films
American parody films
Cultural depictions of Tonya Harding
Films directed by Julie Brown
Films directed by Richard Wenk
Films scored by Christopher Tyng
Films with screenplays by Julie Brown
Films with screenplays by Charlie Coffey (writer)
National Lampoon films
Showtime (TV network) films
1990s American films